The Rocking Horse Winner is a 1949 fantasy film about a young boy who can pick winners in horse races with complete accuracy. It is an adaptation of the D. H. Lawrence short story The Rocking-Horse Winner and starred Valerie Hobson, John Howard Davies and Ronald Squire. Producer of the film John Mills also acted in the film.

It was shot at Denham Studios with sets designed by the art director Carmen Dillon.

Plot
The upper middle-class Grahame family are beset by money troubles, because of the lavish tastes of Hester who spends far more than their income. Her elder brother Oscar bails her out several times but warns that he will not do so in future. Meanwhile her son Paul strikes up a friendship with Bassett, the new handyman and a former jockey. Paul is delighted when he receives a rocking horse for Christmas and shortly afterwards a whip. Concerns about the family's finances and his mother's unhappiness and lack of luck begin to affect Paul who is convinced that the house is whispering about them. He is seen riding his rocking horse in a total frenzy, terrifying his younger sisters.

Convinced that he is lucky, Paul asks Bassett to place a small wager on a horse. Proving to be able to pick winners consistently, which he claims to discover while riding his rocking horse, he forms a secret syndicate with Bassett and his uncle which is soon thousands of pounds in profit. Meanwhile, Hester is struggling with bailiffs and forced to pawn clothes. Desperate to help his mother, Paul agrees that thousands of pounds be given to his mother without her knowing its true source. They pretend this is an inheritance from a distant relative.

Rather than making her happier, Hester becomes even more driven in her reckless spending. Then Paul's apparent gift at picking winners vanishes, and the syndicate loses most of its winnings. Convinced that everything rides on choosing the victor for the Derby, Paul frantically rides on his horse. Eventually he cries out "Malabar" before suffering a seizure. Bassett places the money on the horse, in line with Paul's instructions, and wins £70,000. Shortly after the stricken boy is told of this, he reconnects with his mother telling her that he was 'lucky' and then dies. A distraught Hester instructs Bassett to burn the rocking horse, which he does, and also the money, which he refuses to do, stating he will give it to the family solicitor to find some good to do with it, as Paul would have wanted.

Cast
 Valerie Hobson as Hester Grahame
 John Howard Davies as Paul Grahame
 Ronald Squire as Oscar Cresswell
 John Mills as Bassett
 Hugh Sinclair as Richard Grahame
 Charles Goldner as Mr. Tsaldouris
 Susan Richards as the nannie
 Cyril Smith as the bailiff
 Anthony Holles as Bowler Hat
 Michael Ripper as 2nd Chauffeur 
 Johnnie Schofield as 1st Chauffeur 
 Caroline Steer as Joan Grahame
 Melanie Mackenzie as Matilda Grahame

Reception
The film was considered a faithful adaptation of Lawrence's story.

References

Bibliography
 The Great British Films, pp. 137–139, Jerry Vermilye, 1978, Citadel Press, .

External links
 
 
 

1940s fantasy drama films
British black-and-white films
British fantasy drama films
Films based on short fiction
Films based on works by D. H. Lawrence
Two Cities Films films
Films directed by Anthony Pelissier
Films scored by William Alwyn
Films set in London
Films about gambling
British horse racing films
Films shot at Denham Film Studios
1949 drama films
1940s British films